Përparim Daiu (born 21 April 1970) is a retired Albanian footballer who has served as head coach of several clubs in the Albanian Superliga.

Club career
Daiu played the majority of his career for Besa Kavajë and Partizani Tirana.

International career
He made his debut for Albania in an August 1995 friendly match away against Malta and earned a total of 4 caps, scoring no goals. His final international was a January 1998 friendly against Turkey.

Managerial career
After retiring as a player, Daiu went into coaching and was in charge of hometown club Besa (two spells), Shkumbini (also twice) and Tomori. In January 2012 he took the reins at Laçi for a second time as well. In February 2013 he returned to Besa for a third time as coach.

References

External links

1970 births
Living people
Footballers from Kavajë
Albanian footballers
Association football defenders
Albania international footballers
Besa Kavajë players
KF Teuta Durrës players
Luftëtari Gjirokastër players
FK Partizani Tirana players
Flamurtari Vlorë players
Albanian football managers
Besa Kavajë managers
Shkumbini Peqin managers
FK Tomori Berat managers
KF Laçi managers
Kategoria Superiore players
Kategoria Superiore managers